Thiomonas thermosulfata is a Gram-negative, non-spore-forming bacterium from the genus Thiomonas.

References

Comamonadaceae
Bacteria described in 1997